Mizanur Rahman Shamim is a Major General in the Bangladesh Army who is currently the GOC of 24 infantry division. Prior to join the current appointment, he served as Director General of Bangladesh Ansar and Village Defence Party. He is a gallantry award (Bir Protik) holder for conduct of an operation in Chittagong Hill tracts.

Career
Shamim was the General Officer Commanding of the 19th Infantry Division in 2019. He was the Ghatail Area Commander of Bangladesh Army. He oversaw a joint Bangladeshi-Indian army exercise.

Shamim was appointed the Director General of Bangladesh Ansar and Village Defense Party on 29 July 2020. He replaced Major General Kazi Sharif Kaikobad. On 19 July 2022, he is posted to 24 Infantry Division as General Officer Commanding (GOC) and Area Commander Chattogram Area.

Personal life 
General Shameem is married to Rehana Parveen Mukti. He is a father of a daughter and a son. His son is Shadmanur Rahman Arnab who joined Bangladesh army and commissioned with 75th BMA Long course and earned the Sword and CAS Gold Medal. His daughter is Mashtura Tashfia Arpa who is a student of Bangladesh university of professionals (BUP).

References

Living people
Bangladesh Army generals
Bangladesh Ansar
1968 births
People from Barisal District
University of Chittagong alumni
National University, Bangladesh alumni
American International University-Bangladesh alumni
National Defense College alumni
Recipients of the Bir Protik